The Black Orchid Novella Award is a literary award for excellence in the mystery genre presented by The Wolfe Pack, the official Nero Wolfe Society which was founded in 1978 to explore and celebrate the stories of Nero Wolfe by Rex Stout.

The award is presented annually at the Wolfe Pack's Annual Black Orchid Banquet, traditionally held on the first Saturday in December in New York City. The award was announced in 2006 and was actually given out for the first time in 2007.

To qualify:
 Each entry must be an original unpublished work of fiction that conforms to the tradition of the Nero Wolfe series
 Entries must be 15,000 to 20,000 words in length

Winners

References

External links
 

Novella awards
Mystery and detective fiction awards
Nero Wolfe
Awards established in 2007
2007 establishments in the United States